Ossetian mythology is the collective term for the beliefs and practices of the Ossetian people of the Caucasus region, which contains several gods and supernatural beings. The religion itself is believed to be of Scythian origin, but contains many later elements from Christianity, like the Ossetian gods often being identified with Christian saints. The gods play a role in the famous stories about a race of semi-divine heroes called the Narts.

Deities 
Hutsau or Xucau. The chief of the gods.
Uastyrdzhi (Ossetian: Уастырджи), also known as Lagtydzuar or Lagdzuar, more rarely as Uastylag. Named after Saint George, he is the patron of males and travellers, and the guarantor of oaths. Main patron of North Ossetia–Alania.
Uacilla (Ossetian: Уацилла). Named after Saint Elijah, also spelled Watsilla. God of rain, thunder and lightning. As protector of the harvest he is known as Хоры Уацилла (Hory Uacilla, "Uacilla of the wheat"). Anyone struck by lightning was considered chosen by the god and, if they survived, a sheep was sacrificed in their honour. His festival was celebrated in the summer with the sacrifice of a lamb and a bull and the drinking of specially brewed beer. On that day women baked bread in silence as a mark of reverence.
Safa (Сафа). God of the hearth chain. The most important domestic deity for Ossetians.
Donbettyr. Lord of the waters. He is named after Saint Peter, and is a fusion of the Ossetian don (meaning water) and Peter. He uses his chain to drag down those who unwarily go swimming too late to his realm at the bottom of the sea. He has many beautiful daughters, comparable to the Rusalki of Slavic mythology. Up to the 19th century, his day was celebrated on the Saturday following Easter by young girls.
Dzerassae, one of Donbettyr's daughters, the mother of many Nart heroes.
Tutyr (Тутыр). Named after Saint Theodore of Tyre. Lord of the wolves.
Fælværa (Фæлвæра). Possibly named after Florus and Laurus. Fælværa was the protector of sheep and his festival was celebrated before sheep-shearing in September. He only has one eye. He is often the enemy of Tutyr.
Æfsati (Æфсати). Possibly named after Saint Eustace, he is a male hunting god.
Kurdalægon (Курдалæгон). The heavenly smith. A close friend of the Narts.
Satana (Сатана). Mother goddess, mother of the Narts.
Saubarag (Саубараг or Сау бараджи дзуар, "black rider"), the god of darkness and thieves.
Huyændon Ældar (Хуыæндон Æлдар). Lord of the fish. A great magician and a spirit who behaves like an earthly chief ("ældar"). His name means "Lord of the Strait" (according to Abaev, this is most probably the Cimmerian Bosphorus, the modern Strait of Kerch).
Barastyr (Барастыр, also transliterated Barastaer or Barastir) Ossetian psychopomp. The ruler of the underworld who assigns arriving dead souls to either paradise or his own realm.
Aminon (Аминон). Gatekeeper of the underworld.
Alardy (Аларды). Lord of smallpox, who had to be placated.
 
The uac- prefix in Uastyrdzhi and Uacilla has no synchronic meaning in Ossetic, and is usually understood to mean "saint" (also applied to Tutyr, Uac Tutyr, perhaps Saint Theodore, and to Saint Nicholas, Uac Nikkola). The synchronic term for "saint", however, is syhdaeg (cognate to Avestan Yazata).  Gershevitch (1955) connects uac with a word for "word" (Sanskrit vāc, c.f. Latin vox), in the sense of Logos.

Kurys  (Digor Burku) is a dream land, a meadow belonging to the dead, which can be visited by some people in their sleep. Visitors may bring back miraculous seeds of luck and good fortune, sometimes pursued by the dead. Inexperienced souls may bring back fever and sickness instead. Gershevitch (with V.I. Abaev) compares the name Kurys to the mountain Kaoiris in Yasht 19.6 (Avestan *Karwisa), which might indicate that the name is a spurious remnant of origin legends of Airyanem Vaejah of  the Alans.

Folklore
Ossetian folklore also includes several mythological figures, including those in the Nart sagas, such as the warrior heroes Batraz, Akhshar and Akhsartag.

See also

 Nart saga

Ætsæg Din
Scythian mythology
Persian mythology
Slavic mythology
Georgian mythology

References

Sources

 
 
 
 .

Further reading

 , published in 3 volumes 
 , folklore texts
 , phonetics and grammar of Ossetian; religious beliefs
 , history and ethnography, proverbs
 , based on Miller's 1881 work

External links
 ,  e-text based on the :ru:Мифологический словарь (1990) with articles on various  figures from Ossetian myth

 
European mythology
Iranian mythology
Supernatural beings identified with Christian saints